Tonduff at , is the 169th–highest peak in Ireland on the Arderin scale, and the 202nd–highest peak on the Vandeleur-Lynam scale. Tonduff is in the far northeastern section of the Wicklow Mountains, in Wicklow, Ireland.  The main flat summit is sometimes listed as Tonduff North, while the subsidiary summit, Tonduff East Top , is sometimes listed as Tonduff South.  Tonduff East Top has a prominence of only , which just qualifies it as an Arderin Beg.  A bog on the western slopes of Tonduff, the Liffey Head Bog, forms the source of the River Liffey; bogs on the southern slopes of Tonduff, forms the source of the River Dargle.


Bibliography

See also

Wicklow Way
Wicklow Mountains
Lists of mountains in Ireland
List of mountains of the British Isles by height
List of Hewitt mountains in England, Wales and Ireland

References

External links
MountainViews: The Irish Mountain Website, Tonduff (or Tonduff North)
MountainViews: The Irish Mountain Website, Tonduff East Top (or Tonduff South)
MountainViews: Irish Online Mountain Database
The Database of British and Irish Hills , the largest database of British Isles mountains ("DoBIH")
Hill Bagging UK & Ireland, the searchable interface for the DoBIH

Mountains and hills of County Wicklow
Geography of County Wicklow
Hewitts of Ireland